Saad Sherida al-Kaabi is the current Minister of Energy in Qatar, and the President and CEO of QatarEnergy, the state owned corporation which operates all oil and gas activities in the State of Qatar.

Education 
Al-Kaabi attended Pennsylvania State University in 1986 where he studied petroleum and natural gas engineering. He graduated in 1991 with a Bachelor of Science degree in petroleum and natural gas engineering.

Career 
Al-Kaabi joined QatarEnergy in 1986 during his studies at Pennsylvania State University.

After graduation, al-Kaabi joined QatarEnergy’s Reservoir & Field Development Department. In the following years, he held various positions in petroleum engineering as well as technical, commercial and supervisory positions. Eventually he became Manager of Gas Development, with responsibility for the management of the North Field. He and his team are credited with launching and implementing different gas projects in short time periods and thus contributing to Qatar's rise in LNG and GTL.

In 2006, al-Kaabi became the Director of QatarEnergy’s Oil & Gas Ventures Directorate, responsible now for all of Qatar’s oil and gas fields and all exploration activities. 
In September 2014, al-Kaabi was appointed as QatarEnergy’s Managing Director. He later became President and Chief Executive Officer (November 2014) as part of a major re-organization of QatarEnergy.

Al Kaabi is the chairman of Industries Qatar, a large cooperation overseeing several of the emirate's industrial efforts and dealing primarily in petrochemicals, steel and fertilizers.

He is also chairman of Gulf Drilling International and Adriatic LNG terminal.

References

Living people
Penn State College of Engineering alumni
Qatari chief executives
Year of birth missing (living people)